Saint-René Taillandier (16 December 1817 – 22 February 1879) was a French writer and critic.

Life
Taillandier was born René Gaspard Ernest Taillandier, in Paris. He completed his studies in Heidelberg, and then became professor of literature successively in Strasbourg, Montpellier and at the Sorbonne, where he was nominated to the chair of French eloquence in 1868. Most of the articles included in his published volumes first appeared in the Revue des deux mondes.

In January 1870 he became general secretary of the ministry of education, and continued in this office after the fall of the Empire. He became officer of the Legion of Honour in 1870, and was elected to the Académie française in 1873. He died in Paris.

His works include Allemagne et Russie, études historiques et litteraires (1856), Le Poète du Caucase, Michel Lermontoff (1856), Maurice de Saxe (2 vols. 1865), Tchèques et Magyars (1869), Le Général Philippe de Ségur (1875).

References

Attribution

1817 births
1879 deaths
Writers from Paris
Heidelberg University alumni
Academic staff of the University of Strasbourg
Academic staff of the University of Montpellier
Academic staff of the University of Paris
French literary critics
Members of the Académie Française
Officiers of the Légion d'honneur
French male non-fiction writers